C/2021 J1 (Maury-Attard) is a Halley-type comet discovered on May 9, 2021, by French amateur astronomers Alain Maury and Georges Attard with the MAP (Maury/Attard/Parrott) observation program. It is the first comet discovered with the synthetic tracking technique, made possible with the Tycho Tracker commercial software developed by Daniel Parrott. When it was discovered, it had a magnitude of 19.

It has a 124 day observation arc. It came to perihelion on 19 February 2021. The next perihelion will be in early 2154.

References
 

20210103
Comets in 2021